Qarkhun or Karkhan or Kar-Khun may refer to:

Qarkhun, East Azerbaijan
Karkhan, Markazi
Qarkhun, Qazvin